Deh Kar (also Romanized as Deh Kār; also known as Deh Kār-e Bālā) is a village in Abnama Rural District, in the Central District of Rudan County, Hormozgan Province, Iran. At the 2006 census, its population was 15, in 6 families.

References 

Populated places in Rudan County